The 2001 Kmart 400 was the 14th stock car race of the 2001 NASCAR Winston Cup Series and the 33rd iteration of the event. The race was held on Sunday, June 10, 2001, in Brooklyn, Michigan, at Michigan International Speedway, a two-mile (3.2 km) moderate-banked D-shaped speedway. The race took the scheduled 200 laps to complete. At race's end, Jeff Gordon, driving for Hendrick Motorsports, would manage to hold off the field on the final restart with four to go to win his 55th career NASCAR Winston Cup Series win and his third of the season. The win was also Hendrick Motorsports' 100th NASCAR Winston Cup Series victory. To fill out the podium, Ricky Rudd, driving for Robert Yates Racing, and Sterling Marlin, driving for Chip Ganassi Racing with Felix Sabates, would finish second and third, respectively.

Background 

The race was held at Michigan International Speedway, a two-mile (3.2 km) moderate-banked D-shaped speedway located in Brooklyn, Michigan. The track is used primarily for NASCAR events. It is known as a "sister track" to Texas World Speedway as MIS's oval design was a direct basis of TWS, with moderate modifications to the banking in the corners, and was used as the basis of Auto Club Speedway. The track is owned by International Speedway Corporation. Michigan International Speedway is recognized as one of motorsports' premier facilities because of its wide racing surface and high banking (by open-wheel standards; the 18-degree banking is modest by stock car standards).

Entry list 

 (R) denotes rookie driver.
 (i) denotes driver who is ineligible for series driver points.

Practice

First practice 
The first practice session was held on Friday, June 8, at 12:00 PM EST. The session would last for two hours.

Second practice 
The second practice session was held on Saturday, June 9, at 9:00 AM EST. The session would last for 45 minutes.

Third and final practice 
The final practice session, sometimes referred to as Happy Hour, was held on Saturday, June 9, at 10:30 AM EST. The session would last for one hour and 30 minutes.

Qualifying 
Qualifying was held on Friday, June 8, at 3:10 PM EST. Each driver would have two laps to set a fastest time; the fastest of the two would count as their official qualifying lap. Positions 1-36 would be decided on time, while positions 37-43 would be based on provisionals. Six spots are awarded by the use of provisionals based on owner's points. The seventh is awarded to a past champion who has not otherwise qualified for the race. If no past champ needs the provisional, the next team in the owner points will be awarded a provisional.

Five drivers would fail to qualify: Mike Wallace, Rick Mast, Andy Houston, Stacy Compton, and Kenny Wallace.

Full qualifying results

Race results

References 

2001 NASCAR Winston Cup Series
NASCAR races at Michigan International Speedway
June 2001 sports events in the United States
2001 in sports in Michigan